Iceland planned to participate in the Eurovision Song Contest 2020, which was scheduled to be held in Rotterdam, Netherlands. Icelandic broadcaster  (RÚV) held a televised selection process,  2020, to choose its entry for the contest. Following two semi-finals and a final, "Think About Things", written by Daði Freyr Pétursson and performed by Daði og Gagnamagnið, emerged as the winner of the event in February 2020. In mid-March 2020, due to the spread across Europe of the coronavirus disease 2019 (COVID-19), the European Broadcasting Union (EBU) announced the contest's cancellation, with Daði  subsequently announcing that they would represent Iceland at the 2021 contest.

During  2020 and following its selection as Iceland's entry, "Think About Things" went on to become a viral phenomenon and was considered one of the favourites to win the contest before the cancellation. It went on to win several alternative contests, held by national broadcasters in place of Eurovision to determine their public's favourite song, including Austria's  and Sweden's .

Background 

Prior to the 2020 contest, Iceland had participated in the Eurovision Song Contest 32 times following its first entry in 1986 and had failed to participate on only two occasions since their debut. The contest has been broadcast in Iceland since as early as 1970, but the geographically-remote nation was prevented from competing until a stable satellite connection could be established to enable live transmission of it. In , Iceland marked their fourth consecutive non-qualification when Ari Ólafsson and the song "Our Choice" placed 19th and last in the first semi-final, standing as the country's worst result at the contest.

The Icelandic national broadcaster,  (RÚV), broadcasts the event within Iceland and organises the selection process for the nation's entry. The Icelandic broadcaster has used various methods to select the Icelandic entry in the past, such as internal selections and televised national finals to choose the performer and song to compete at Eurovision. Since 2006 RÚV has chosen its entry for Eurovision through , a televised music competition. RÚV confirmed its intention to participate at the 2020 contest on 13 September 2019 through a post on the official  Facebook page, and concurrently affirmed details for the production of  2020 to select its entry as well as opening the song submission process.

Before Eurovision

Söngvakeppnin 2020 
RÚV once again organised  ("The Singing Competition") to determine the Icelandic entry for the Eurovision Song Contest.

The 2020 contest was announced on 13 September 2019 and until 17 October, interested artists and songwriters were invited to submit entries for the contest through the  website. Alongside this open submission process RÚV also held discussions with experienced Icelandic songwriters inviting them to write entries for the competition. Each composer could submit up to two songs for consideration, while lyricists could be credited on an unlimited number of songs. A total of 157 songs were subsequently registered for the competition, 25 more than those entered for the previous contest; a seven-member panel consisting of individuals from the Icelandic Society of Authors and Composers (FTT) and the Icelandic Musicians' Union (FÍH) was tasked with selecting ten songs to compete in the semi-finals.

Ahead of the contest, it was reported that RÚV had signed a sponsorship deal with American streaming platform Netflix worth , which would contribute to  2020. This was part of Netflix's ambitions to grow in the Nordics region and RÚV's plans to improve its media operations, as well as to better compete with international content providers. This agreement was reported soon after the conclusion of filming for Netflix's Eurovision-themed film Eurovision Song Contest: The Story of Fire Saga (2020), which was filmed in the town of Húsavík and other parts of Iceland.

Competing entries 
The 10 competing artists and songs were revealed by RÚV on 18 January 2020, and were presented for the first time the same day through the special programme  ("Introductory Episode of the Song Competition"). The songs were initially leaked on Spotify a number of hours before the official presentation on RÚV, which inadvertently revealed the artists competing in the event. Per the rules of the contest, all entries were required to be performed in Icelandic in the semi-finals, with artists being given a free choice on language should their song reach the final.

Shows

Semi-finals 
Two semi-finals took place on 8 and 15 February 2020. In each semi-final five of the ten competing acts performed and two entries determined solely by the viewing public through telephone voting progressed to the final. Per the rules of the competition an additional optional qualifier could be selected by the contest organisers from among the non-qualifying acts, which would also progress to the final. This option was subsequently invoked by the organisers, meaning that a total of five acts qualified for the final.

A number of guest performances also featured during the two shows. The first semi-final featured performances by GDRN and 2003 Icelandic Eurovision entrant Birgitta Haukdal and an appearance by Icelandic actress . The second semi-final featured performances by Flóni, who performed a rendition of the 1991 Icelandic Eurovision entry "Draumur um Nínu", and Elín Ey, who performed the 1974 Eurovision winning entry "Waterloo".

Final 

The  2020 final took place on 29 February 2020 and featured the five qualifiers from the semi-finals. In the final artists had a free choice in which language they could perform; three of the qualifiers subsequently performed their entries in English. "" by Iva was originally scheduled to be performed in English, however the authors subsequently requested that the Icelandic version be featured in the final instead, a change which was subsequently approved by the contest organisers.

Two rounds of voting determined the winning song: in the first round, the votes of the viewing public through telephone voting and the votes of a 10-member international jury panel determined two entries which would progress to the second round. The public and jury each accounted for 50% of the result in the first round, with the rankings of each jury member being added to the number of televotes cast by the public. In the second round a further round of televoting was held, with the winner determined by aggregating the results of the first round to the votes received in the second round. Following both rounds of the competition, "Think About Things" performed by Daði  emerged the winner of  2020 and was selected as Iceland's entry for the Eurovision Song Contest 2020. The full results of the semi-finals and the full breakdown of jury and televoting results in the final were revealed on 2 March 2020.

A number of guests performances also featured during the show. Stjórnin, who represented Iceland in the Eurovision Song Contest 1990, performed their Eurovision song "Eitt lag enn" to mark 30 years since its first performance. The reigning  champions Hatari, and 2019 Norwegian Eurovision entrants Keiino also performed during the show, with Hatari reprising their Eurovision entry "Hatrið mun sigra" with a children’s choir and Keiino performing their latest single "Black Leather".

Promotion 

Shortly after Daði 's victory in  2020, Iceland quickly became one of the favourites to win the contest according to bookmakers. Even before the final of  however, "Think About Things" gained great attention online and became a viral phenomenon following the release of the song's music video ahead of the contest's second semi-final. Following their performance at the  semi-final, the track and performance gained traction online, and was shared on Twitter by several well-known personalities, including UK television presenters Rylan Clark-Neal and India Willoughby, and German journalist  and satirist Jan Böhmermann. The song also gained the attention of Irish comedian Dara Ó Briain and New Zealand Academy Award-winning actor Russell Crowe, the latter who tweeted his support for the group with simply the word "Song."

Before the contest each year, many Eurovision fan clubs host events with some of the participating acts from that year's event. The Swedish branch of OGAE held its event,  2020 on 6 March 2020, which featured Daði  alongside a number of other acts confirmed for the 2020 contest. However, several other pre-events, including Israel Calling in Tel Aviv, the PrePartyES in Madrid and the Eurovision in Concert in Amsterdam were subsequently cancelled or postponed indefinitely in March 2020 due to the rising severity of the COVID-19 pandemic in Europe, preventing further promotional activities in person.

At Eurovision 
The Eurovision Song Contest 2020 was originally scheduled to take place at Rotterdam Ahoy in Rotterdam, Netherlands and consist of two semi-finals on 12 and 14 May, and a final on 16 May 2020. According to Eurovision rules, each country, except the host nation and the "Big Five" (France, Germany, Italy, Spain and the United Kingdom), would have been required to qualify from one of two semi-finals to compete for the final; the top 10 countries from each semi-final would have progressed to the final. On 28 January 2020, the allocation draw was held at Rotterdam City Hall, placing Iceland into the first half of the second semi-final. However, due to the COVID-19 pandemic in Europe, the contest was cancelled on 18 March 2020. The EBU announced soon after that entries intended for 2020 would not be eligible for the following year, though each broadcaster would be able to send either their 2020 representative or a new one. Although the contest was cancelled, its producers revealed an official running order for the two semi-finals; had the contest gone ahead as originally planned, Iceland would have performed in the second semi-final in position number 9.

Following the contest's cancellation, RÚV announced a packed schedule of Eurovision programming which they would broadcast over the traditional Eurovision week. This included , an alternative contest to determine Iceland's favourite song from the 2020 contest and the hypothetical recipient of its 12 points; a live broadcast of the EBU's replacement special Eurovision: Europe Shine a Light, which showcased all the artists and songs which would have competed in the contest; a "Eurovision Party" broadcast live from the Harpa concert hall in Reykjavík, hosted by 2008 Icelandic Eurovision entrants Eurobandið and featuring the group and guest artists performing past Eurovision entries; and re-broadcasts of several Eurovision contests from the past. Daði also participated in a number of events organised by the EBU, featuring in an episode of Eurovision Home Concerts where Eurovision artists performed from home during various lockdowns across Europe, and taking part in Eurovision 2020 online host Nikkie de Jager's Eurovisioncalls video series on the official Eurovision YouTube channel and in Europe Shine a Light.

Alternative contests 
Some of the broadcasters scheduled to take part in the Eurovision Song Contest 2020 organised alternative competitions following its cancellation. Austria's ORF broadcast  in April 2020, which saw every entry being assigned to one of three semi-finals. A jury consisting of 10 singers that had represented Austria at Eurovision before was hired to rank each song; the best-placed entry in each semi-final advanced to the final round. Iceland performed in the first semi-final on 14 April and emerged the winner, achieving 75 points. The final on 18 April saw the Austrian public selecting its favourite act of the three qualified entries; Iceland was crowned the winner with 48% of the vote. Iceland's song also partook in 's  on 14 May; After qualifying for the final Daði  emerged as Sweden's favourite act, gaining maximum points from both the jury and Swedish public, and receiving an invitation to perform at the 2021 edition of Sweden's national selection, . Iceland also competed in Germany's Eurovision 2020 – das deutsche Finale; after progressing through the semi-final on 9 May, "Think About Things" was one of 10 songs competing to be voted Germany's favourite song of 2020 in the final on 16 May. Daði gave a live performance of his Eurovision song during the show held at the Elbphilharmonie in Hamburg, subsequently finishing in second place behind 's The Roop.

Following the cancellation 
Following the contest's cancellation, Daði subsequently revealed in an interview with Icelandic radio station Bylgjan that he would be interested in representing Iceland at Eurovision in 2021 but only if invited to do so by RÚV, stating he would not participate in  again. On 15 September 2020, Iceland's Head of Delegation Felix Bergsson confirmed RÚV's intention to compete at the Eurovision Song Contest 2021, but at the time he did not reveal whether Daði would be re-selected to represent Iceland again or  would make its return.

"Think About Things" went on to enter the music charts in several European countries, reaching number two in the Netherlands, number three in Belgium, the top four in Ireland and the top 40 in both Sweden and the United Kingdom. The song also gained popularity on several Internet media providers, with the song racking up over 17 million views on YouTube, over 75 million plays on Spotify and entering the UK Top 50 and US Viral charts, and featuring on over 115,000 videos on TikTok by May 2020. The song's popularity continued to rise throughout 2020, being used in programming such as the BBC's Strictly Come Dancing in the UK, and in December 2020 "Think About Things" was listed by Time magazine as one of its "10 Best Songs of 2020".

References

External links 
 

2020
Countries in the Eurovision Song Contest 2020
Eurovision